Vadim Viktorovich Rudnev (1874 – 19 November 1940) was a Russian politician and editor. On 11 July 1917, Moscow City Duma elected him Moscow's Gorodskoy Golova (Московский городской голова - literally "Moscow city's head").

In Russia
Vadim Rudnev studied medicine at Moscow University, but in 1902 was exiled to Siberia for his revolutionary activities.  Amnestied in 1905 with other political prisoners, he became a member of the Socialist-Revolutionary Party.  In 1907 he was arrested again; after four years in Siberia he moved to Switzerland to complete his medical education.  At the outbreak of World War I, the SRs (like other revolutionary parties) split into 'Defencist' and 'Internationalist' antiwar groups; Rudnev, like his colleagues AA Argunov and ND Avksentiev, took the former position, in opposition to the party's leaders, Victor Chernov and Mark Natanson, and worked as a doctor on a hospital ship.  During the February Revolution he was a leader of the Moscow branch of the party and edited its newspaper Trud, and in July he was chosen mayor of Moscow; he supported the policies of Alexander Kerensky.  He opposed the October Revolution, and after the dispersal of the Constituent Assembly (of which he was a member) he fled south, first to Kiev, then the Caucasus, and finally Odessa.  In April 1919 he left Russia.

In emigration
Rudnev, like many Russian émigrés, moved to Paris, where along with his fellow SR Ilya Fondaminsky he founded Sovremennye zapiski [Contemporary Notes], which became the main literary journal of the Russian emigration (publishing, for instance, most of Nabokov's Russian-language work).  Nina Berberova, in her memoirs, calls Rudnev "a very dear man" who did not understand literature.  When the Germans captured Paris in World War II, he moved to the south of France, where he died of cancer in Pau.

References
 Manfred Hildermeier. The Russian Socialist Revolutionary Party Before the First World War, 1978, 2000.
 Michael Melancon, The Socialist Revolutionaries and the Russian Anti-War Movement, 1914–1917, 1990.
 Nina Berberova, The Italics Are Mine, 1969, rev. ed.  1991.

External links
 Russian biography page

1874 births
1940 deaths
Socialist Revolutionary Party politicians
Russian Constituent Assembly members
Mayors of Moscow
Russian military personnel of World War I
Emigrants from the Russian Empire to France